1876 Salvadoran presidential election may refer to one of two elections which occurred in El Salvador in 1876:

 January 1876 Salvadoran presidential election
 June 1876 Salvadoran presidential election